Antonio Gaona (born 19 April 1982) is a Mexican actor, best known for his role of Emilio Echegaray in the TV Azteca's crime drama series Rosario Tijeras (2016–2017).

Early life 
Gaona was born on 19 April 1982 in Mexico City, Mexico. He is a graduate of the CasAzul School of Performing Arts.

Filmography

Film roles

References

External links 
 

1982 births
Living people
Mexican male telenovela actors
Mexican male film actors
21st-century Mexican male actors
People from Mexico City